Brachtendorf is an Ortsgemeinde – a municipality belonging to a Verbandsgemeinde, a kind of collective municipality – in the Cochem-Zell district in Rhineland-Palatinate, Germany. It belongs to the Verbandsgemeinde of Kaisersesch, whose seat is in the like-named town.

Geography 

The municipality lies in the Eifel roughly 5 km north of the river Moselle.

History 
Since 1946, Brachtendorf has been part of the then newly founded state of Rhineland-Palatinate.

Politics

Municipal council 
The council is made up of 6 council members, who were elected by majority vote at the municipal election held on 7 June 2009, and the honorary mayor as chairman.

Mayor 
Brachtendorf's mayor is Eike Gries.

Culture and sightseeing

Buildings 
The following are listed buildings or sites in Rhineland-Palatinate’s Directory of Cultural Monuments:
 Saint Lambert’s Catholic Church (branch church; Filialkirche St. Lambertus), Hauptstraße 18 – quarrystone aisleless church, 1848-1849.

Poetry 
In the early 1930s, the village schoolteacher at the time, named Siebenborn, was inspired to set pen to paper with these words:

Clubs 
Brachtendorf has a lively club life. Besides the two registered clubs, namely the Saint Sebastian Marksmen's Brotherhood (St. Sebastianus Schützenbruderschaft 1892 e.V.) with its local Brachtendorf chapter and the sport club (Sportverein Blaue Jungs e.V.), there are also the Möhnen (or “women fools”, a Shrovetide/Carnival tradition), the women's association and the volunteer fire brigade.

References 

Cochem-Zell